Osku Torro (born 21 August 1979) is a Finnish high jumper.

He was born in Jyväskylä. He competed at the 2006 European Championships, the 2007 European Indoor Championships, the 2010 World Indoor Championships and the 2010 European Championships without reaching the final.

His personal best jump was 2.27 metres, achieved in August 2007 in Lappeenranta and also in July 2008 in Tampere. He has 2.33 metres on the indoor track, achieved in February 2011 in Tampere. This is a Finnish indoor record.

Competition record

References

1979 births
Living people
Finnish male high jumpers
Sportspeople from Jyväskylä
Athletes (track and field) at the 2012 Summer Olympics
Olympic athletes of Finland
Competitors at the 2005 Summer Universiade
Competitors at the 2007 Summer Universiade
21st-century Finnish people